Cochirleanca is a commune in Buzău County, Muntenia, Romania. It is composed of five villages: Boboc, Cochirleanca, Gara Bobocu, Roșioru and Târlele.

Natives
 Dan Alexe

Notes

Communes in Buzău County
Localities in Muntenia